The Moonlighter is a 1953 American 3D Western film directed by Roy Rowland and starring Barbara Stanwyck and Fred MacMurray. Distributed by Warner Bros., it premiered alongside the 1953 Looney Tunes 3-D Bugs Bunny cartoon, Lumber Jack-Rabbit and the 3-D Lippert short, Bandit Island.

Plot
Wes Anderson (MacMurray) has been "moonlighting," rustling cattle at night under the moon. A lynch mob led by rancher Alex Prince accidentally hangs the wrong man due to a mixup from a cell change during a jail cleaning. Wes escapes.

Rela (Stanwyck), his former sweetheart, after a 5-year absence by Wes, is now involved with Wes' younger brother Tom, who works in a bank. Tom has always admired Wes. Wes seeks vengeance on the lynch party and begins killing some of Prince's hands who lynched the innocent man.

Tom is fired at the Rio Hondo bank by Mott, his boss. Cole Gardner, an outlaw, persuades Wes to rob the bank, and Tom decides to join them. Rela angrily warns Wes that if any harm comes to Tom, she will hold him responsible.

During the robbery, Wes and Cole get away with the money, but Tom is shot by his former boss. A posse is formed and Rela demands to be deputized and bring back Wes dead or alive. Cole double-crosses his partner, taking the money and leaving Wes tied up. When Cole encounters Rela on the trail, she outflanks and shoots Cole and then finds Wes tied up, taking him prisoner.

On the way back to town, Rela slips in a waterfall and nearly drowns. Wes saves her life. Ashamed of his ways, Wes offers to ride back to town alongside Rela to turn himself in to the law and accept his fate of possibly 25 years to life imprisonment. Wes asks Rela to wait for him.

Cast
 Barbara Stanwyck as Rela
 Fred MacMurray as Wes Anderson
 Ward Bond as Cole Gardner
 William Ching as Tom Anderson
 John Dierkes as Sheriff Daws
 Morris Ankrum as Alexander Prince
 Jack Elam as Slim, Strawboss
 Myron Healey as Joe
 Charles Halton as Clemmons Usqubaugh - Undertaker
 Norman Leavitt as Tidy
 Sam Flint as Mr. Mott, Bank President
 Myra Marsh as Mrs. Anderson

Production
The railroad scenes were filmed on the Sierra Railroad in Tuolumne County, California.

Reception
TBA

References

External links

1953 Western (genre) films
1953 3D films
1950s English-language films
American black-and-white films
1953 films
Films directed by Roy Rowland
American Western (genre) films
Films scored by Heinz Roemheld
American 3D films
1950s American films